"The Breath You Take" is a Grammy nominated song recorded by American country music artist George Strait, and the fourth single from his album Twang.  It was released on July 12, 2010 as the 91st single of his career. It was written by veteran songwriter Dean Dillon, Jessie Jo Dillon, and Casey Beathard. It became his 83rd Top 10 hit on the Country charts. On November 10, 2010, Strait performed the song live on the CMA Awards. It received a 2011 Grammy Awards nomination in the "Best Country Song" category on December 1, 2010.

Content
The song is about savoring and realizing the important moments in life, whether they be large or small. The story is told through fatherly love, starting by giving examples from the baseball field of a boy's youth and moving to the more emotionally jarring times, birth and death.

Critical reception
The song has been widely popular amongst listeners, but has received mixed reviews. The Washington Times called it overly "maudlin." A review in the Houston Chronicle said, "try and keep your eyes dry" while listening to the song.

Chart performance
The song debuted at number 58 on the U.S. Billboard Hot Country Songs chart for the week of July 3, 2010, two weeks before its official release date of July 12, 2010. It peaked at number 6 on the country chart dated January 15, 2011.

Year-end charts

References

2010 singles
2009 songs
Country ballads
2010s ballads
George Strait songs
Songs written by Dean Dillon
Songs written by Casey Beathard
Song recordings produced by Tony Brown (record producer)
MCA Nashville Records singles
Songs written by Jessie Jo Dillon